Gerald Aylmer (1926–2000) was an English historian.

Gerald Aylmer may also refer to:

Gerald Aylmer (judge), (c. 1500–1559), Irish judge
Sir Gerald Aylmer, 1st Baronet (1548–1634) of the Aylmer baronets
Sir Gerald Aylmer, 5th Baronet (1703–1737) of the Aylmer baronets
Sir Gerald Aylmer, 8th Baronet (1798–1878) of the Aylmer baronets
Sir Gerald Aylmer, 9th Baronet (1830–1883) of the Aylmer baronets
Sir Gerald Aylmer, 14th Baronet (1869–1939) of the Aylmer baronets

See also
Aylmer (surname)